At Christmas is the seventh studio album by American singer Freddie Jackson. It was released by Orpheus Music and RCA Records on October 25, 1994. His first Christmas album, it consists of eleven teen tracks, featuring four original songs, three of them co-penned with Jackson, and seven cover versions of Christmas standards and carols. The album reached number 65 on the US Top R&B/Hip-Hop Albums.

Critical reception

Allmusic editor Roch Parisien wrote that "featuring overstated atmosphere, Jackson makes the effort to co-pen three original songs – "One Wish," "Come On Home for Christmas," and the title track."

Track listing
All tracks produced and arranged by Barry Eastmond.

Charts

References 

1994 albums
Freddie Jackson albums
Christmas albums by American artists